The William & Mary Tribe baseball team represents the College of William & Mary in Williamsburg, Virginia in NCAA Division I competition. The school's team, founded in 1895, currently competes in the Colonial Athletic Association and play their home games at the off-campus Plumeri Park.

History
The Tribe have played in four NCAA tournaments, 1983, 2001, 2013, and 2016, but have never qualified for the College World Series. The Tribe's combined NCAA tournament record is 4–8 (.333). They have won seven conference championships, with the most recent coming in 2016. The team has an all-time record of 1,432–1,565–12 (.478) over 119 season of play.

Conference affiliations
 Southern Conference − 1947–1977
 ECAC South − 1983–1985
 Colonial Athletic Association − 1986–present

Venue

The William & Mary Tribe men's baseball team currently plays at off-campus Plumeri Park which opened in 2001 and has a seating capacity of 1,000. The stadium is named after William & Mary alumnus Joseph J. Plumeri II who also played on the baseball team as member of the Class of 1966. Previously, the baseball team played on campus on a field located next to Zable Stadium on land currently occupied by practice fields for the football team as part of the Jimmye Laycock Football Center.

Head coaches
The program's longest tenured head coaches was Jim Farr who served as head coach for 12 seasons from 1993 to 2005.

NCAA tournament results

Notable former players

Consensus All-Americans

MLB players

MLB draftees
William & Mary has had 43 Major League Baseball Draft selections since the draft began in 1965.

References

External links
 Tribe Baseball (Official website)